UDP-arabinopyranose mutase (Os03g40270 protein, UAM1, UAM3, RGP1, RGP3, OsUAM1, OsUAM2, Os07g41360 protein) is an enzyme with systematic name UDP-arabinopyranose pyranomutase. This enzyme catalyses the following chemical reaction

 UDP-beta-L-arabinofuranose  UDP-beta-L-arabinopyranose

The reaction is reversible.

References

External links 
 

EC 5.4.99